Pang Yan (born 15 January 1963) is a Chinese athlete. He competed in the men's long jump at the 1988 Summer Olympics.

References

1963 births
Living people
Athletes (track and field) at the 1988 Summer Olympics
Chinese male long jumpers
Olympic athletes of China
Place of birth missing (living people)
20th-century Chinese people